The 1997 San Francisco 49ers season was the franchise's 48th season in the National Football League and their 52nd overall. The franchise appeared in the NFC Championship Game for the fifth time in the 1990s. This season marked their last appearance in the NFC title game until the 2011 season as well as the last time that they clinched the number 1 seed until the 2019 season. The team's playoff run was ended by the Green Bay Packers for the third straight season.

Offseason

NFL draft

Undrafted free agents

Personnel

Staff

Roster

Regular season 
Opening the 1997 season with new coach Steve Mariucci and halfback Garrison Hearst, the 49ers seemed to have shored up their one major weakness from the season before. Also, additions Kevin Gogan to the offensive line and Rod Woodson to the defense were clear improvements over last season's roster.

However, in the first game of the season at Tampa Bay both quarterback Steve Young and receiver Jerry Rice went down with injuries. Rice appeared to be out for the season with a serious knee injury and Young, with yet another concussion, discussed retirement.

Young eventually came back, as did Rice for  quarters (before getting another unrelated injury to his knee), and the team, with the league's number one defense leading the way, pulled together and finished strongly at 13–3.

Schedule

Game Summaries

Week One at Tampa 
Steve Mariucci's debut game as 49ers head coach did not go well as Steve Young was sacked by Warren Sapp on San Francisco's first drive and was benched due to injury for Jeff Brohm until the fourth quarter, who made no difference in a 13–6 Bucs win.

Week Two at St. Louis 
Jim Druckenmiller started for Young as the Niners entered the TWA Dome. The Rams scored first on a field goal while San Francisco's first drive saw a missed attempt; Druckenmiller completed only ten passes (on 28 throws) and three of them were on this drive but later in the second he completed a 25-yard touchdown (it would be the only touchdown of his NFL career). The Rams led 12–7 on four Jeff Wilkins field goals until following a Lawrence Phillips fumble with 12 minutes remaining Garrison Hearst burst in a 35-yard Niners score on the resulting San Francisco possession. The Rams failed on fourth down in the final five minutes for the 15–12 Niners win.

Week Three vs. New Orleans 
The Niners' first home game of the year was another win over the Saints, who were led this time by ex-Bears coach Mike Ditka. Despite being sacked five times Steve Young completed eighteen passes for 220 yards and three touchdowns. Saints quarterbacks threw a combined six interceptions in the game.

Week Four vs. Atlanta Falcons 
Young again blew past 30 points scored as the Niners routed the Falcons 34–7. Young completed 17 of 24 passes for 336 yards and two touchdowns, one a 56-yarder to Terrell Owens.

Week Five vs. Carolina Panthers 
After just one win in four career games against the Panthers in Carolina's first two seasons the Niners upended the slumping Panthers 34–21. The Niners jumped to a 27–7 lead as they intercepted Kerry Collins three times.

Week Seven vs. St. Louis Rams 
The Niners crushed the Rams at 3Com Park 30–10 as they held Tony Banks to just nine completions while sacking him four times.

Week Eight at Atlanta Falcons 
A week after getting their first win of the season (against New Orleans) the Falcons hosted the Niners and their first drive ended in a 27-yard touchdown throw by Jamal Anderson to Bert Emanuel. The Niners scored three straight touchdowns and kept answering ensuing Falcons touchdowns with more of their own. With the score 35–28 San Francisco the Falcons attempted an onside kick but the Niners recovered and won the game.

Week Nine at New Orleans Saints 
The Niners traveled 470 miles southwest to the Superdome and flustered the 2–6 Saints yet again. Three Saints quarterbacks could only muster 109 yards with a pick and a fumble as the Niners rolled 23–0.

Week 10 vs. Dallas Cowboys 
The playoff-level intensity of the 1992–96 period was gone as the faltering Cowboys limped into 3Com Park at 4–4 and actually led in the third quarter 10–7, but the surging Niners scored ten more points then intercepted Troy Aikman in the final minute on a pass intended for Stepfret Williams; the 17–10 Niners win would in essence be a last hurrah for the rivalry that had dominated the league earlier in the decade. It was also the last win at home until 2022.

Week 11 at Philadelphia Eagles 
The Niners traveled to Veterans Stadium and won 24–12, snaring three Eagles turnovers and scoring on a Merton Hanks fumble return and a Chuck Levy punt return.

Werk 12 vs. Carolina Panthers 
The Niners picked off Kerry Collins three more times and held the Panthers under 260 total yards as they reached ten straight wins 23–19.

Week 13 vs. San Diego Chargers 
The collapse of San Diego's season after a 4–4 start continued as only a Paul Bradford fumble-return score marred San Francisco's 17–10 win.

Week 14 at Kansas City Chiefs 
Three years after their loss to Joe Montana at Arrowhead Stadium, the Niners were crushed 44–9 as Rich Gannon threw three touchdowns and Steve Young threw three interceptions and Jeff Brohm threw a pick six.

Week 15 vs. Minnesota Vikings 
Steve Young rebounded with two touchdowns in a 28–17 win over the Vikings. In a harbinger of the Vikings’ subsequent season Randall Cunningham played the whole game and had two touchdowns.

Week 16 vs. Denver Broncos 
The Niners reached thirteen wins by crushing the Super Bowl-bound Denver Broncos 34–17. The Broncos led 17–14 in the third quarter but after a Niners field goal John Elway was picked off by Merton Hanks and Hanks scored. Another Niners field goal and a fumble return score by Kevin Greene salted away the San Francisco win.

Week 17 at Seattle Seahawks 
Having secured the top playoff seed the Niners played all three of their quarterbacks at the Kingdome and the frustrated Seahawks ended their 8–8 season on a high note as Warren Moon erupted for four touchdowns in only his second career win (38–9) in six games against San Francisco (the other win was a 10–7 win with the Oilers).

Standings

Playoffs 

Toward the end of the season, things appeared to be going well for the team's postseason prospects. However, in the second to last game of the season, Rice was injured again and deemed out for the playoffs. Similarly, the team's offensive heart for the season, running back Garrison Hearst, had a broken collar bone through the post season and did not return to full health prior to the end of the season.

Despite not having either their leading receiver or their starting running back, the 49ers were able to make it to their 7th NFC championship game in 10 years. However, not having an elite receiver or solid running back showed glaringly in their loss to the Packers in the conference championship game (Hearst returned, but his injury was clearly still a problem as he only played a few ineffective snaps).

NFC Divisional Game vs. Minnesota Vikings

NFC Championship Game vs. Green Bay Packers 

The 49ers and Packers met in the playoffs for the 3rd year in a row, and for the 3rd year in a row, the Packers defeated the 49ers. The 49ers were battling multiple injuries in the game, including missing star wide receiver Jerry Rice. The lack of depth on offense showed throughout the game, as the offense generated just 3 points. The only touchdown of the game for the 49ers was Chuck Levy's 95-yard kick return for a touchdown. But by then, the Packers had a commanding 23–10 lead in the 4th quarter. With the loss, the 49ers finished the year at 14–4.

Awards and records 
 Steve Young, Led NFL, Passer Rating, 104.7 Rating

References

External links 
 49ers on Pro Football Reference
 49ers Schedule on jt-sw.com

San Francisco 49ers
NFC West championship seasons
San Francisco 49ers seasons
1997 in San Francisco
San